NGC 418 is a barred spiral galaxy of type SB(s)c located in the constellation Sculptor. It was discovered on September 28, 1834 by John Herschel. It was described by Dreyer as "faint, pretty large, round, very gradually a little brighter middle, western of 2.", the other being NGC 423.

References

External links
 

0418
18340928
Sculptor (constellation)
Barred spiral galaxies
004189